Seyid Mohammad Ali Qazi Tabatabaei (1914 – 1979) was an Iranian politician, Shiite cleric, first imam Jumu'ah for Tabriz and Representative of the Supreme Leader in East Azerbaijan. He was born in Tabriz, East Azerbaijan. He was a member of the Muslim People's Republic Party in Tabriz. He was assassinated by People's Mujahedin of Iran, when praying in Tabriz. Qazi Tabatabaei in the Iranian political literature named him the first martyr of mihrab.

References

People from Tabriz
Assassinated Iranian politicians
Assassinated Iranian people
1914 births
1979 deaths
Iranian Shia scholars of Islam
Representatives of the Supreme Leader in the Provinces of Iran